Shi Yue or Shiyue may refer to:

People
Shi Yue (Former Qin) (died 384), military general of Former Qin
Shi Yue (Go player) (born 1991), Chinese Go player
Shi Yue (fencer) (born 1999), Chinese fencer

Others
Shiyue, the tenth month of the Chinese calendar
Shiyue (magazine), Chinese literary magazine